Jacob Benedicto is a Filipino singer and actor born in Manila. He first gained recognition when he joined the blind auditions of The Voice of the Philippines. Although none of the judges' chairs turned, Benedicto dominated social media because of his good looks and soulful voice. The following year, in April 2014, he joined Pinoy Big Brother: All In. Dubbed as the "Cutie Crooner ng Paranaque", Jacob spent 5 weeks inside the house and was the 4th housemate to be evicted on the 3rd elimination night.

ABS-CBN Career
Benedicto is currently a regular on the ABS-CBN series Dream Dad as Jaymart. His first single "Pagka't Ikaw" is also included in the newly launched 'OPM Fresh' album from Star Music.

Filmography

Television

Film

Discography

Singles

References

External links

1992 births
Living people
ABS-CBN personalities
People from Parañaque
Pinoy Big Brother contestants
Singers from Metro Manila
Star Magic
Star Music artists
The Voice of the Philippines contestants
21st-century Filipino singers